The Sausalito Woman's Club, at 120 Central Avenue in Sausalito, Marin County, California, was built in 1918.  It was designed by Bay Area architect Julia Morgan.  It was listed on the National Register of Historic Places in 1993.

It is a Craftsman-style building, of irregular plan with 18 corners.

Funds for the women's club to have a clubhouse were raised during 1913 to 1918.

The building was declared Sausalito's Historical Landmark #1 in 1976.

References

American Craftsman architecture in California
Women's club buildings in California
National Register of Historic Places in Marin County, California
Cultural infrastructure completed in 1918
History of women in California
1918 establishments in California
Clubhouses on the National Register of Historic Places in California
Sausalito, California